Kieran Whittle (born 16 July 1994) is a British male acrobatic gymnast. For their first major international competition, Farai Bright-Garamukanwa and Kieran Whittle achieved bronze in the 2014 Acrobatic Gymnastics World Championships.

References

1994 births
Living people
British acrobatic gymnasts
Male acrobatic gymnasts
Medalists at the Acrobatic Gymnastics World Championships
21st-century British people